Omorgus squalidus is a beetle of the family Trogidae.

References 

squalidus
Beetles described in 1789